Abisara delicata, the delicate Judy is a butterfly in the family Riodinidae. It is found in Tanzania and Malawi.

Geographic distribution
Abisara delicata is widely distributed in the submontane forests of the Malawi highlands. Subspecies tanzania occurs in the Usambara, Nguu, Nguru, and Udzungwa mountains of northeastern Tanzania. Subspecies zanzibarica is restricted to Zanzibar Island.

Ecology
The species can be found in submontane and lowland forests east of the main Rift Valley, including the Eastern Arc forests in Tanzania.

Subspecies
Abisara delicata delicata (highlands of Malawi)
Abisara delicata tanzania Kielland, 1986 (eastern Tanzania)
Abisara delicata zanzibarica Collins, 1990 (Tanzania: Zanzibar)

References

Butterflies described in 1901
Abisara
Butterflies of Africa